Bishop Peak is a peak, rising to , near the center of Rampart Ridge, in the Royal Society Range. It was mapped by United States Geological Survey (USGS) from ground surveys and Navy air photos, and named by Advisory Committee on Antarctic Names in 1963 for the Bernice P. Bishop Museum, Honolulu, which has been active in Antarctic research.

References

Royal Society Range
Mountains of Victoria Land
Scott Coast